The 1974 British League season was the 40th season of the top tier of speedway in the United Kingdom and the tenth season known as the British League.

Summary
The 1973 Champions Reading didn't compete as they no longer had a stadium, following the closure of Reading Stadium and Hull Vikings replaced them. The league was reduced to seventeen teams when the Coatbridge Tigers dropped down to Division Two. Overseas riders that rode in other leagues abroad were banned which meant that top Swedish riders such as Anders Michanek, Bernt Persson, Tommy Jansson and Christer Löfqvist didn't compete.

The Exeter Falcons won their first title. They were headed by the legendary four time world champion Ivan Mauger and backed up well by Scott Autrey (8.32), Tony Lomas (7.29) and Kevin Holden (7.26).

At the end of the season Oxford Rebels finished four points above the Hull Vikings courtesy of a protest over Hull's victory against the Rebels. Hull were later re-awarded the points after a close season hearing and moved above the Rebels.

Final table
M = Matches; W = Wins; D = Draws; L = Losses; Pts = Total Points

British League Knockout Cup
The 1974 Speedway Star British League Knockout Cup was the 36th edition of the Knockout Cup for tier one teams. Sheffield were the winners.

First round

Second round

Quarter-finals

Semi-finals

Final

First leg

Second leg

Sheffield Tigers were declared Knockout Cup Champions, winning on aggregate 90-65.

Final leading averages

Riders & final averages
Belle Vue

 10.98
 9.72
 8.68
 7.47
 7.24
 6.49
 4.15
 3.24
 2.73

Coventry

 8.50
 6.70
 5.96
 5.78
 4.97
 4.50
 4.34
 2.13
 1.75

Cradley Heath

 10.06 
 (Kid Brodie) 7.70
 6.19
 5.79
 5.56
 4.70
 4.14
 4.00
 3.33
 2.09

Exeter

 10.88
 8.32
 7.79
 7.29 
 7.26 
 5.57
 5.52
 4.76
 4.23

Hackney

 10.17
 7.78
 6.34 
 5.76
 5.37
 5.33
 5.29
 4.48

Halifax

 9.61
 7.50
 7.20
 7.01
 5.43
 4.81
 4.75
 2.77
 2.61

Hull

 9.71 
 7.77
 5.73
 5.52 
 5.14
 5.11
 5.09
 4.14

Ipswich

 10.79
 9.34
 8.29
 6.19
 5.53
 5.18
 4.80
 4.50
 4.29

King's Lynn

 10.32
 9.78
 6.36
 5.81
 5.25
 4.87
 4.77

Leicester

 9.66 
 9.34
 6.46
 5.77
 5.41
 3.45
 3.29
 2.62

Newport

 10.79 
 9.42
 7.70 
 5.26
 5.08
 4.76
 4.36
 4.15

Oxford

 8.32
 7.32
 6.89
 6.86
 6.76
 5.18
 4.15
 4.00
 3.72
 1.60

Poole

 8.58
 7.28
 6.31
 6.29
 5.27
 2.54
 2.29

Sheffield

 9.92 
 9.23 
 9.13 
 7.24
 6.98
 6.40
 5.91
 4.70

Swindon

 10.09 
 7.97
 6.37
 5.10
 4.55
 4.51
 4.06
 3.58
 2.50

Wimbledon

 9.30
 7.09
 6.64
 5.84
 5.45
 5.17
 5.02
 3.03

Wolverhampton

 11.39
 8.04
 6.53
 5.38
 4.28
 4.04
 3.20
 2.59
 2.33

See also
List of United Kingdom Speedway League Champions
Knockout Cup (speedway)

References

British League
1974 in British motorsport
1974 in speedway